David Miguélez Miguel (born 5 May 1981 in Gijón, Asturias) is a Spanish footballer who plays as a striker.

External links

1981 births
Living people
Footballers from Gijón
Spanish footballers
Association football forwards
Segunda División players
Segunda División B players
Tercera División players
Divisiones Regionales de Fútbol players
CD Mensajero players
UD Vecindario players
Real Balompédica Linense footballers
CD Lugo players
UE Sant Andreu footballers
AD Alcorcón footballers
Racing de Santander players
CD Guadalajara (Spain) footballers